Beth Tikvah Synagogue is an egalitarian synagogue in the Willowdale neighbourhood of Toronto, with a membership of approximately 1100 families. Although the worship style is traditional-conservative, the synagogue formally disaffiliated with the United Synagogue of Conservative Judaism in 2013.

The synagogue was founded on April 14, 1964 as Shaarei Tikvah, after a synagogue in Amsterdam that had been razed by the Nazis. It became Beth Tikvah after a merger in 1966 with the Bayview Synagogue Association. Rabbi Avraham Feder served as the first rabbi of the synagogue from 1967, and he continues to serve as Rabbi Emeritus. Srul Irving Glick, the famed composer and conductor, served as Beth Tikvah's composer-in-residence from 1969 to 2002.

References

Synagogues in Toronto
1964 establishments in Ontario
Jewish organizations established in 1964